The minister-president of Rhineland-Palatinate, is the head of government of the German state of Rhineland-Palatinate. The position was created in 1946, through the unification of the southern part of the Prussian Rhine Province, the Bavarian administrative district Circle of the Rhine and western parts of Hesse like Rheinhessen to form the state of Rhineland-Palatinate. The current minister-president is Malu Dreyer, heading a coalition government between the Social Democrats, Greens and the FDP. Dreyer succeeded Kurt Beck in 2013.

The office of the minister-president is known as the State Chancellery and is located in the capital of Mainz, along with the rest of the cabinet departments.

List
Political party:

See also
Rhineland-Palatinate
Politics of Rhineland-Palatinate
Landtag of Rhineland-Palatinate

Ministers-President
 
Rhineland-Palatinate
Rhineland-Palatinate